Bliss, in comics, may refer to:

 Bliss (Marvel Comics), a member of the Marvel Comics mutant group The Morlocks
 Bliss (DC Comics), an incubus who appeared in the DC Comics series Starman
 Bliss (Wildstorm), a Wildstorm comic book character
 Bliss, a syndicated newspaper comic by Harry Bliss

See also
Bliss (disambiguation)

Comics characters